The Norwegian Military College was a military educational institution in Norway.

It was established on 16 February 1817, with headquarters at Akershus Fortress. It was originally meant for artillery and engineer officers, but in 1826 it was expanded to include naval officers as well—however, not many naval officers actually attended.

There were several changes in the length of the education offered at the Military College. From 1901 a two-year course was offered, educating personnel to the General Staff. The school had been mandatory for General Staff members since 1850. The school saw its demise in 1940, the same year as Norway was invaded and occupied by Germany.

References

 
Defunct military academies
Norway
Educational institutions established in 1817
Educational institutions disestablished in 1940
Education in Oslo
1817 establishments in Norway